Torghatten ASA  is a Norwegian shipping company based in Brønnøysund. The company's areas of operation include operating bus, car ferries, fast ferries, travel agencies, real estate, security and maintenance. The company's main asset is a 100% ownership in Fosen Trafikklag.

The companies ship operations include car- and passenger ferry operations in southern Helgeland, between Bindal and Sandnessjøen. TTS operates four bus routes out of Brønnøysund, to Mosjøen, Sandnessjøen Grong and Namsos.

In addition to operations in its own name, Torghatten owns 100% of Fosen Trafikklag. This company again operates car- and passenger ferries in Sør-Trøndelag, owns Bastø Fosen that operates the Bastø Ferry. It also owns Innherredsferja, Lekaferja, Norgesbuss and TrønderBilene, that again owns 74% of Gauldal Billag that owns Østerdal Billag. Furthermore, the company also has some joint venture in shipping, including 5% of Edda Gas (49% being owned by Bergesen d.y.) and 50% of an Aframax ship.

References

 
Shipping companies of Norway
Ferry companies of Nordland
Bus companies of Trøndelag
Ferry companies of Trøndelag
Bus companies of Nordland
Transport companies established in 1878
Norwegian companies established in 1878